The Men's individual kata competition at the 2022 European Karate Championships was held from 25 to 28 May 2022.

Results

Round 1

Round 2

Round 3

Finals

References

External links
Draw

Men's individual kata